The 2020 Melbourne Cup (known commercially as the 2020 Lexus Melbourne Cup) was the 160th running of the Melbourne Cup, a prestigious Australian Thoroughbred horse race.

The final field for the race was declared on 31 October. The total prize money for the race was A$8 million, the same as the previous year.

Due to the COVID-19 pandemic, the  public and horse owners were not able to attend the event.

The race was won by Twilight Payment, ridden by Jye McNeil and trained by Joseph O'Brien.

Field

Fatalities
Anthony Van Dyck was euthanised after suffering a fractured fetlock, becoming the second horse that had to be euthanized at Flemington in 2020, and the sixth horse to die during the Melbourne Cup since 2013.

References

Notes

Melbourne Cup
Melbourne Cup
Melbourne Cup
2020s in Melbourne